Pal Joey is a 1957 American musical comedy film directed by George Sidney, loosely adapted from the Rodgers and Hart musical play of the same name, and starring Rita Hayworth, Frank Sinatra, and Kim Novak. Jo Ann Greer sang for Hayworth, as she had done previously in Affair in Trinidad (1952) and Miss Sadie Thompson (1953). Novak's singing voice was dubbed by Trudy Stevens. The choreography was managed by Hermes Pan. Nelson Riddle handled the musical arrangements for the Rodgers and Hart standards "The Lady Is a Tramp", "I Didn't Know What Time It Was", "I Could Write a Book", and "There's a Small Hotel".

Sinatra won the Golden Globe Award for Best Actor - Motion Picture Musical or Comedy for his role as the wise-cracking, hard-bitten Joey Evans. Along with its strong box-office success, Pal Joey earned four Academy Award nominations and one Golden Globe Award nomination. 
 
Pal Joey is one of Sinatra's few post-From Here to Eternity films in which he did not receive top billing, which surprisingly went to Hayworth. Sinatra was, by this time, a bigger star, and his title role was predominant. When asked about the billing, Sinatra replied, "Ladies first." He was quoted as saying that, as it was a Columbia film, Hayworth should have top billing because "For years, she was Columbia Pictures" and that with regard to being billed "between" Hayworth and Novak: "That's a sandwich I don't mind being stuck in the middle of." As Columbia's biggest star, Hayworth had been top-billed in every film since Cover Girl in 1944, but her tenure was to end in 1959 with Gary Cooper in They Came to Cordura.

Sinatra's earnings from the film paid for his new home in Palm Springs. He was so delighted that he also built a restaurant there dedicated to the film, named Pal Joey's.

Plot

In San Francisco, Joey Evans is a second-rate singer, a heel known for his womanizing ways (calling women "mice"), but charming and funny. When Joey meets Linda English, a naive chorus girl, he has stirrings of real feelings. However, that does not stop him from romancing a former flame and ex-stripper (Joey says, "She used to be 'Vera Vanessa the undresser...with the Vanishing Veils'"), now society matron Vera Prentice-Simpson, a wealthy, willful, and lonely widow, in order to convince her to finance Chez Joey, a night club of his own.

Soon Joey is involved with Vera, each using the other for his/her own somewhat selfish purposes; however, Joey's feelings for Linda are growing. Ultimately, Vera jealously demands that Joey fire Linda. When Joey refuses ("Nobody owns Joey but Joey"), Vera closes down Chez Joey. Linda visits Vera and agrees to quit in an attempt to keep the club open. Vera then agrees to open the club and even offers to marry Joey, but Joey rejects Vera. As Joey is leaving for Sacramento, Linda runs after him, offering to go wherever he is headed. After half-hearted refusals, Joey gives in, and they walk away together.

Cast

 Rita Hayworth as Vera Prentice-Simpson
 Frank Sinatra as "Pal" Joey Evans 
 Kim Novak as Linda English
 Barbara Nichols as Gladys 
 Bobby Sherwood as Ned Galvin
 Judy Dan as hat check girl (uncredited)
 Hank Henry as Mike Miggins
 Bek Nelson as Lola

Production
According to Dorothy Kingsley, who wrote the script, the film was going to be made starring Kirk Douglas and directed by George Cukor. However Lilian Burns, who was Harry Cohn's assistant, felt only Frank Sinatra could play the role. Sinatra and Cohn were feuding but Kingsley and Burns persuaded Cohn to accept Sinatra. Burns' husband George Sidney ultimately directed the film.

George Sidney enjoyed working with Frank Sinatra. They would film in the afternoon as that was when Sinatra preferred to work and film until early in the morning.

Notable changes
The happy ending of the film contrasts with the conclusion of the stage musical, where Joey is left alone at the end.

The transformation of Joey into a "nice guy" diverges from the stage musical, where Joey's character is an anti-hero. Joey is also older in the film—on stage he was played by 28-year old Gene Kelly; here, 42-year old Sinatra takes the reins.

The film differs from the stage musical in other key points: the setting was moved from Chicago to San Francisco, and on stage Joey was a dancer. The plot of the film drops a blackmail attempt, and two roles prominent on stage were changed: Melba (a reporter) was cut, and Gladys became a minor character. Linda became a naive chorus girl instead of an innocent stenographer and some of the lyrics to "Bewitched, Bothered and Bewildered" were changed. Also in the film, Vera Prentice-Simpson is a wealthy widow and former stripper (billed as Vanessa the Undresser) and thus gets to sing the song "Zip". (Since that number requires an authentic burlesque drummer to mime the bumps and grinds, the extra playing the drums is disconcertingly swapped with a professional musician in a jump cut).

Song list
Of the original 14 Rodgers and Hart songs, eight remained, but with two as instrumental background, and four songs were added from other shows.

Pal Joey: Main Title  
"That Terrific Rainbow" - chorus girls and Linda English 
"I Didn't Know What Time It Was" (introduced in the 1939 musical Too Many Girls) - Joey Evans
"Do It the Hard Way" - orchestra and chorus girls 
"Great Big Town" - Joey Evans and chorus girls 
"There's a Small Hotel" (introduced in the 1936 musical On Your Toes) - Joey Evans
"Zip" - Vera Simpson
"I Could Write a Book" - Joey Evans and Linda English 
"The Lady Is a Tramp" (introduced in the 1937 musical Babes in Arms) - Joey Evans
"Bewitched, Bothered and Bewildered" - Vera Simpson 
"Plant You Now, Dig You Later" - orchestra 
"My Funny Valentine" (introduced in the 1937 musical Babes in Arms) - Linda English
"You Mustn't Kick It Around" - orchestra 
Strip Number - "I Could Write a Book" -Linda English
Dream Sequence and Finale: "What Do I Care for a Dame"/"Bewitched, Bothered and Bewildered"/"I Could Write a Book" - Joey Evans

Soundtrack
Some of the recordings on the soundtrack album featuring Sinatra only are not the same songs that appeared in the film. "The Lady Is a Tramp" is a mono-only outtake from Sinatra's 1957 album A Swingin' Affair!, while three others ("There's a Small Hotel", "Bewitched", and "I Could Write a Book") were recorded in mono only at Capitol Studios. "I Didn't Know What Time It Was" appeared in an odd hybrid: The first half of the song was recorded at Columbia Pictures but differs from the version used in the film, while the second half is the same as used in the film, also recorded at Columbia. "What Do I Care for a Dame" is the film version, as recorded at Columbia. The Sinatra songs as they appear in the film as well as those performed by Rita Hayworth and Kim Novak (both were dubbed), Jo Ann Greer (Hayworth) and Trudi Erwin (Novak) were recorded at Columbia Pictures studios in true stereo.

Charts
Album chart usages for UK2

Critical reception and box office
Opening to positive reviews on October 25, 1957, Pal Joey was an instant success with critics and the general public alike. Variety stated, "Pal Joey is a strong, funny entertainment. Dorothy Kingsley's screenplay, from John O'Hara's book, is skillful rewriting, with colorful characters and solid story built around the Richard Rodgers and Lorenz Hart songs. Total of 14 tunes are intertwined with the plot, 10 of them being reprised from the original. Others by the same team of cleffers are 'I Didn't Know What Time It Was', 'The Lady Is a Tramp', 'There's a Small Hotel' and 'Funny Valentine'."

The New York Times stated, "This is largely Mr. Sinatra's show...he projects a distinctly bouncy likeable personality into an unusual role. And his rendition of the top tunes, notably "The Lady Is a Tramp" and "Small Hotel," gives added lustre to these indestructible standards."

With theatrical rentals of $4.7 million in the United States and Canada, Pal Joey was ranked by Variety as one of the 10 highest-earning films of 1957. It earned rentals of $7 million worldwide.

Awards and nominations

Other honors

The film is recognized by American Film Institute in these lists:
 2004: AFI's 100 Years...100 Songs:
 "My Funny Valentine" – Nominated
 2006: AFI's Greatest Movie Musicals – Nominated

References

Further reading

External links

 
 
 
 

1957 films
1957 musical comedy films
American musical comedy films
Columbia Pictures films
Films based on American novels
Films based on musicals
Films directed by George Sidney
Films featuring a Best Musical or Comedy Actor Golden Globe winning performance
Films set in San Francisco
Films shot in San Francisco
1950s English-language films
1950s American films